The 2014–15 Mid-American Conference women's basketball season began with practices in October 2014, followed by the start of the 2014–15 NCAA Division I women's basketball season in November. Conference play began in January 2015 and concluded in March 2015. Ohio won the regular season title with a record of 16–2 by three games over Ball State. Sina King of Akron was named MAC player of the year.

Ohio won the MAC tournament by beating sixth-seeded Eastern Michigan 60–44 in the final. They lost to Arizona State in the first round NCAA tournament. Eastern Michigan, Ball State, Akron, Buffalo, Toledo, and Western Michigan all qualified for the WNIT.

Preseason awards
The preseason coaches' poll and league awards were announced by the league office on October 29, 2014.

Preseason women's basketball coaches poll
(First place votes in parenthesis)

East Division
  (8)
  (3)
 
 Ohio (1)

West Division
  (11)
  (1)

Tournament champs
Central Michigan (10), Ball State (1), Buffalo (1)

Honors

Postseason

Mid–American tournament

NCAA tournament

Women's National Invitational Tournament

Postseason awards

Coach of the Year: Bob Boldon, Ohio
Player of the Year: Sina King, Akron
Freshman of the Year: Jay-Ann Bravo Harriott, Toledo
Defensive Player of the Year: Christa Baccas, Buffalo
Sixth Man of the Year: Mackenzie Loesing, Buffalo

Honors

See also
2014–15 Mid-American Conference men's basketball season

References